Robert Lowery may refer to:

Robert Lowery (actor) (1913–1971), American actor
Robert Lowery (basketball) (born 1987), American basketball player
Robert Lowery (canoeist) (born 1937), British canoer who competed in the Summer Olympics
Robert Lowery (musician) (1931–2016), blues musician
Robert Newton Lowery (1882–1962), Canadian politician from Manitoba
Robert O. Lowery (1916–2001), New York City Fire Commissioner